Morris is an unincorporated community in Nicholas County, in the U.S. state of West Virginia.

History
A post office called Morris was established in 1911, and remained in operation until 1964. The community was named after a local family.

References

Unincorporated communities in Nicholas County, West Virginia
Unincorporated communities in West Virginia